Assam University is a collegiate central public university located at Silchar, Assam, India. It was founded in the year 1994 by the provisions of an act enacted by the Parliament of India. The Governor of Assam is the Chief Rector and the President of India is acting as the Visitor of the university. The Chancellor is the ceremonial head of the university while the executive powers rest with the Vice-chancellor. The university has sixteen schools which offer Humanities, Languages, Environmental Sciences, Information Sciences, Life Sciences, Physical Sciences, Social Sciences, Law, Technology and Management Studies. There are 42 departments under these sixteen schools. The five districts under the jurisdiction of Assam University have 73 undergraduate colleges as on 31 March 2020. Assam University is an institutional signatory to the Global Universities Network for Innovation (GUNI), Barcelona and United Nations Global Compact (UNGC) for its commitment to educational social responsibilities.

Assam University is the second Central University of Assam after Tezpur University. Both were established in 1994.

History 
The history of Assam University is the history of people's struggle in Barak Valley. It is one of the subsequent outcomes of the Bengali Language Movement in the southern part of Assam. The Shaheed Minar built near the front gate of the university commemorates the sacrifices of the martyrs during the historical language movement in 1961.

Schools and departments 
The major teaching schools of the university along with the departments under them are:

Abanindranath Tagore School of Creative Arts and Communication Studies
Department of Mass Communication
Department of Visual Arts
Department of Performing Arts
Albert Einstein School of Physical Science
Department of Chemistry
Department of Physics
Department of Mathematics
Department of Statistics
Department of Computer Science
Aryabhatta School of Earth Sciences
Department of Earth Sciences
Ashutosh Mukhopadhyay School of Education
Department of Educational Science
Deshabandhu Chittaranjan School of Legal Studies
Department of Law
E. P. Odam School of Environmental Sciences
Department of Ecology and Environmental Science
Hargobind Khurana School of Life Sciences
Department of Life Science & Bioinformatics
Department of Biotechnology
Department of Microbiology
Jadunath Sarkar School of Social Sciences
Department of Anthropology
Department of History
Department of Political Science
Department of Social Work
Department of Sociology
Jawaharlal Nehru School of Management Studies
Department of Business Administration
Department of Hospitality and Tourism Management
Mahatma Gandhi School of Economics and Commerce
Department of Commerce
Department of Economics
Rabindranath Tagore School of Indian Languages and Cultural Studies
Department of Bengali
Department of Hindi
Department of Indian Comparative Literature
Department of Linguistics
Department of Manipuri
Department of Sanskrit
Sarvepalli Radhakrishnan School of Philosophy
Department of Philosophy
Shushrutu School of Medical and Paramedical Sciences
Department of Pharmaceutical Sciences
Suniti Kumar Chattopadhyay School of English and Foreign Language Studies
Department of English
Department of Arabic
Department of French
 Department of Linguistics
Department of Comparative Studies
Department of Urdu
Swami Vivekananda School of Library Sciences
Department of Library & Information Science
Triguna Sen School of Technology
Department of Agricultural Engineering
Department of Computer Science & Engineering
Department of Electronics & Communication Engineering
Department of Applied Science & Humanities

Campus 

The university is situated at 20 kilometres south from Silchar main city at Dargakuna near Irongmara village. The university is located at hilly area with greenery scenario.

For accommodation, there are five hostels for girls, and four hostels for boys available in the campus.

Transportation

The university provide bus service from university campus to various places. Including bus services from Silchar and Hailakandi to university campus. There are also private transportation like auto-rickshaw.

Ranking 

Assam University was ranked 93rd in the university category by the National Institutional Ranking Framework (NIRF) of 2021.

Affiliated colleges 
All the colleges in the 6 districts of South Assam, viz, Cachar, Hailakandi, Karimganj,  North Cachar Hills or Dima Hasao, Karbi Anglong district and West Karbi Anglong district fall within university's jurisdiction. Notable affiliated colleges include:

 A K Chanda Law College, Tarapur, Silchar
 Barkhola College, Silchar
 Cachar College, Silchar
 Diphu Government College, Diphu
 Diphu Law College, Diphu
 Dr S B Institution of Education, Hailakandi
 Eastern Karbi Anglong College, Sarihajan
 Gurucharan College, Silchar
 Haflong Government College
 Hailakandi Women's College, Hailakandi
 J N Singh College, Silchar
 Janata College,Cachar
 Kaliganj Pioneer College ( Karimganj)
 Kapili College, Donkamukam
 Karimganj College, Karimganj
 Karimganj Law College, Karimganj
 Katigorah A Degree College, Silchar
 Lala Rural College
 M H C Memorial Sc College, Hailakandi
 Nabinchandra College, Badarpur
Nilambazar College, Nilambazar
 Patharkandi College of Education, Karimganj
 Katlicherra Model College, Hailakandi
 Hailakandi College, Hailakandi
 Rabindra Sadan Girls' College, Karimganj
 Ramanuj Gupta Junior and Degree College, Silchar
 Radhamadhab College, Silchar
 Ramkrishna Nagar College, Karimganj
 Rangsina College, Dongkamokam 
 SC Dey College, Hailakandi
 SM Dev College, Lakhipur
 Thong Nokbe College, Dokmoka
 Srikishan Sarda College, Hailakandi.
 Vivekananda College of Education, Karimganj
 Women's College, Silchar

References

External links 

 
Educational institutions established in 1994
Central universities in India
Silchar
1994 establishments in Assam
Universities in Assam